is the first greatest hits album by Japanese singer Yōko Oginome. Released through Victor Entertainment on December 25, 1985, the album compiles Oginome's singles from 1984 to 1985, including her hit single "Dancing Hero (Eat You Up)". The LP's track listing differs from that of the CD and cassette versions.

The album peaked at No. 15 on Oricon's albums chart and sold over 106,000 copies.

Track listing 
CD/Cassette

LP

Charts

References

External links
 
 

1985 greatest hits albums
Yōko Oginome compilation albums
Japanese-language compilation albums
Victor Entertainment compilation albums